The Hudson Terraplane Utility Coupe is an automobile that was manufactured by Hudson Motor Car Company of Detroit, Michigan, between 1937 and 1942.

Production history
In 1937 (the first year of production), the automobile was known as the Hudson Terraplane Utility Coupe. It was one of 17 different models in the Terraplane line (nine in the "Deluxe"/Series 71 line and eight in the "Super Terraplane"/Series 72).

For the 1939 model year, the Terraplane brand was dropped for both trucks and autos, and the vehicle was called the Hudson Utility Coupe for the rest of its production cycle.

Even though the manufacturing of civilian automobiles was discontinued from 1942 to 1945 (so all production could be dedicated to the war effort), Hudson did not resume making the utility coupe after the war ended.

Not only was this particular coupe model rare, it was also different from a regular coupe because it could be used either as a car or a truck. The Hudson Utility Coupe had a  L-head straight-six engine, rated at 96 horsepower, giving the Hudson Terraplane Utility coupe the most power of its class, for that time. Not only did the utility coupe have power, it also had strength, the complete load capacity being rated for a half ton. The Hudson Utility Coupe had a strong  wheelbase platform.

From 1937 to 1939 the Hudson Utility Coupe used radial safety control suspension.

In 1940, Hudson altered the Utility Coupe’s front suspension system from its original safety control system to an independent front suspension.

Features
Mounted inside the vehicle's trunk was a steel box mounted on sliding rails (similar to the pull-out drawers of toolboxes). The steel box had a chain-supported tailgate. Handles were attached to the end of the box, used to slide the box in and out. When the box was being pulled out, there were two points in which it could be extended, making the loading and unloading of cargo easier. The ability to pull the box out is what made the utility coupe capable of being used like a pickup truck. If there was no need for it in its pickup form, the box could be slid into the trunk of the coupe. Once the trunk was closed the Hudson utility coupe looked like a regular car.

The Hudson Terraplane Utility Coupe was a business car, especially for salesman who needed to transport their samples. The design allowed the salesman to carry their products regardless of weather conditions. If they were transporting a product that was long, the salesmen were able to slide the cargo box out and let the tailgate down. They could also detach the trunk door for the larger products, if necessary.

See also
 Hudson Commodore top Hudson car line from same era
 Essex early Hudson car
 Hudson Super Six specs for the Hudson Super Six

References

External links
 Hudson-Essex-Terraplane Club
 Hudson Car Club & Hudson Essex Terraplane Historical Society online club & information-source

Coupés
Utility Coupe
Rear-wheel-drive vehicles
1930s cars
1940s cars
Cars introduced in 1937